Ponte Sublicio, also known as Ponte Aventino or Ponte Marmoreo, is a bridge linking Piazza dell'Emporio to Piazza di Porta Portese in Rome (Italy), in the Rioni Ripa, Trastevere and Testaccio and in the Quartiere Portuense.

The most ancient bridge in Rome crossed river Tiber just downstream of the Tiber Island, in correspondence with the former ford that, during the protohistoric age, was a required stop along the north-south way, at the feet of the Aventine Hill. Its building has been ascribed to King Ancus Marcius (642 - 617 BC) by Livy and Dionysius of Halicarnassus.

Origin of the name
The name comes from the Volscian word sublica, meaning "wood planks". In effect the bridge had been entirely built with wood and it is famous for the mythical episode of Horatius Cocles, during the first years of the Roman Republic.

Present bridge
The present bridge, bearing the same name of the ancient one, was built in 1918 after a design by Marcello Piacentini; it links the two banks of the Tiber in correspondence to Piazza di Porta Portese and Piazza dell'Emporio.

Ancient bridge

No remains have left of the ancient bridge, but it rose in correspondence to the present Via del Porto (probably close to the present Via di Ripa, as suggested by the text "Roma, Il primo giorno" by A. Carandini - Laterza, 2012), at the north end of the monumental complex of San Michele a Ripa Grande.

The religious tradition (originated by the necessity to easily disassemble the bridge for defense purposes) prescribed that no other material than wood could be used. The bridge was held sacred (the designation "pontiff" or pontifex derives from the term pons) and archaic ceremonies were played on it, among which the throwing into the river of the Argei, or straw puppets (maybe a recollection of more ancient human sacrifices) during the ceremony called Lemuria.

The bridge withstood several restorations and reconstructions (60 BC, 32 BC, 23 BC, 5 AD, 69 AD, under Antoninus Pius and maybe under Emperors Trajan, Marcus Aurelius and Septimius Severus). On the imperial-age monetary depictions, the far ends of the bridge show arches with statues.

Remarkable remains of the bridge had been visible in the bed of Tiber until 1890 or so, when they were completely demolished during the works for the adaptation of the urban stretch of the river, as a preventive measure against floods.

References

Bridges in Rome
Stone bridges in Italy
Road bridges in Italy
Rome R. XIII Trastevere
Rome R. XII Ripa
Rome R. XX Testaccio